Dr. Shrinivas Khandewale is an Indian Agro-economist. He is an activist for separate statehood of Vidarbha. He authored several studies on agriculture in Vidarbha region.

References

Indian agricultural economists
Living people
Year of birth missing (living people)